Arthur McKee (14 August 1863 – 9 March 1943) was a New Zealand newspaper proprietor, photo-engraver and printer, land agent, businessman, orchardist. He was born in Liverpool, Lancashire, England on 14 August 1863. He was one of the directors behind the company that published The Cyclopedia of New Zealand.

References

1863 births
1943 deaths
New Zealand businesspeople
New Zealand writers
New Zealand horticulturists
English emigrants to New Zealand
New Zealand orchardists